Delete Yourself! is the debut album by German music group Atari Teenage Riot.

The song "Speed" was used in the 2006 film The Fast and the Furious: Tokyo Drift.

Track listing

Samples
"Into the Death" samples Thanatos' "Bodily Dismemberment"

Notes

External links
Delete Yourself CD at Discogs
Atari Teenage Riot at MySpace
Official Digital Hardcore Recordings site

1995 debut albums
Atari Teenage Riot albums
Grand Royal albums